Sanjida Akhter (born 20 March 2001) is a Bangladeshi women's football player, who plays as a midfielder for Bashundhara Kings Women and the Bangladesh women's national football team. She was the member of AFC U-14 Girls' Regional Championship – South and Central winning Bangladesh U-14 held in Nepal in 2015. She currently plays football for Bangladesh women's football team, and Bashundhara King's Women. She played all five matches at 2017 AFC U-16 Women's Championship qualification in Group C held in Dhaka, Bangladesh. She is a well known woman footballer in the history of Bangladesh women's football team.

Early years 
Sanjida Akter was born on 20 March 2001 in  Kalsindur, Dhobaura, Mymensingh district.

Playing career 
Sanjida first played in 2011 Bangamata Sheikh Fazilatunnesa Mujib Gold Cup Football Tournament for Kolsindur Govt. Primary School.

International 
Sanjida was selected to the Bangladesh girls' U-17 team for the 2015 AFC U-16 Women's Championship qualification – Group B matches in 2014. She also played AFC U-14 Girls' Regional Championship – South and Central held in Nepal in 2015, where Bangladesh U-14 Girls' became Champion. She played in 2017 AFC U-16 Women's Championship qualification – Group C matches. She capped 9 times for the U-17 nationals and scored 4 goals. Being group C champion, Bangladesh have qualified for the 2017 AFC U-16 Women's Championship in Thailand in September 2017.

She later played in 2019 AFC U-19 Women's Championship qualification and the 2020 AFC Women's Olympic Qualifying Tournament.

Club career
Sanjida joined Bangladesh Women's Football league team Bashundhara Kings Women in 2019 and made appearances for the club as their starting midfielder during the 2019-20 Bangladesh Women's Football League season.

Honours

Club 
Bashundhara Kings Women

 Bangladesh Women's Football League
 Winners (2): 2019–20, 2020–21

International 
SAFF Women's Championship
Winner : 2022
Runner-up : 2016
South Asian Games
Bronze : 2016
SAFF U-18 Women's Championship
Champion (1): 2018
Bangamata U-19 Women's International Gold Cup
Champion trophy shared (1): 2019 She was the best player in the tournament. 
AFC U-14 Girls' Regional C'ship – South and Central
Bangladesh U-14 Girls'
Champion : 2015

References

External links 
 

2001 births
Living people
Bangladeshi women's footballers
Bangladesh women's international footballers
Bashundhara Kings players
Bangladesh Women's Football League players
Women's association football midfielders
People from Mymensingh District
Bangladeshi women's futsal players
Kalsindur Government Primary School alumni
South Asian Games bronze medalists for Bangladesh
South Asian Games medalists in football